Assael Architecture is a British architectural firm based in London, established in 1994.

Background
Assael Architecture was established in 1994, co-founded and owned by John Assael and Russell Pedley. Registered in the United Kingdom and a RIBA chartered practice. The firm's principal studios are located in London. It is a member of the AJ100, consisting of the 100 largest architecture practices in the UK and ranked by the Architects' Journal in 2016 as the 70th largest practice in Britain. Notable buildings include the Great Northern Tower in Manchester, and the Tachbrook Triangle on Vauxhall Bridge Road, Westminster, London which won a RIBA Housing Design Award in 2007.

Notable buildings
 Great Northern Tower, Manchester
 Tachbrook Triangle, Vauxhall Bridge Road, London. Housing Design Awards
 Rochester Row, London. Building-for-Life Award 2010 - Gold Standard
 Wallis House, Great West Quarter, London
 Renaissance, Lewisham, London.
 Macaulay Walk, Clapham, London
 Creekside Wharf, Greenwich, London

Awards
 Architect of the Year 2016, The Sunday Times British Homes Awards
 Best Housing Project 2016 for Battersea Square, The Sunday Times British Homes Awards
 AJ120 2015 winner of Business Pioneer of the Year
 Building Magazine's Good Employer Guide Winner 2014 and 2015
 Housing Design Award 2014, Project winner Private Rented Sector (PRS) for Young Street, Kensington & Chelsea, London 
 Cabe Building for Life Award 2010, Gold Standard for Rochester Row, Westminster, London

References

External links
 Assael.co.uk Official website

Architecture firms based in London
Design companies established in 1994
1994 establishments in the United Kingdom